Olivier Bernasconi (born 14 April 1977) is a Monegasque taekwondo practitioner. He competed in the men's 68 kg event at the 2000 Summer Olympics.

References

1977 births
Living people
Monegasque male taekwondo practitioners
Olympic taekwondo practitioners of Monaco
Taekwondo practitioners at the 2000 Summer Olympics
Place of birth missing (living people)